Lindsey Alvarez is an American sound engineer.

Alvarez was born in Houston, Texas. She won a Primetime Emmy Award in the category Outstanding Sound Mixing for her work on the television program Only Murders in the Building. Her win was shared with Alan DeMoss, Mathew Waters and Joseph White Jr.

References

External links 

Living people
Year of birth missing (living people)
People from Houston
American audio engineers
21st-century American engineers
21st-century American women
Primetime Emmy Award winners